Czermno-Kolonia  is a village in the administrative district of Gmina Fałków, within Końskie County, Świętokrzyskie Voivodeship, in south-central Poland.

References

Czermno-Kolonia